This is a list of submissions to the 80th Academy Awards for Best Foreign Language Film. The Academy of Motion Picture Arts and Sciences has invited the film industries of various countries to submit their best film for the Academy Award for Best Foreign Language Film every year since the award was created in 1956. The award is handed out annually by the Academy to a feature-length motion picture produced outside the United States that contains primarily non-English dialogue. The Foreign Language Film Award Committee oversees the process and reviews all the submitted films.

For the 80th Academy Awards, which were held on February 24, 2008, the Academy invited 95 countries to submit films for the Academy Award for Best Foreign Language Film. Sixty-three countries submitted films to the Academy, the highest number of submissions in the history of the award, including Azerbaijan and Ireland, which submitted films for the first time. Several of the submissions were subject to controversy. The Academy determined that initial submissions from Israel and Taiwan did not meet Academy requirements, and both countries submitted new films as replacements. Bolivia's official submission, Los Andes no creen en Dios, did not appear on the Academy's list of accepted submissions.

Due to a change in the rules made for the 79th Academy Awards, the Academy published a shortlist of nine films on January 15, 2008, prior to the selection of the final five nominees. The Academy engendered controversy with its selections, notably the omission of Romania's 4 Months, 3 Weeks and 2 Days, which had won the Palme d'Or at the 2007 Cannes Film Festival, and France's Persepolis, the winner of the Jury Prize at the same Cannes Film Festival. After revealing the shortlist, the Academy released a list of nominees on January 22, 2008. The winner of the Academy Award for Best Foreign Language Film was Austria's The Counterfeiters, which was directed by Stefan Ruzowitzky.

Submissions

Notes
 Bolivia submitted Los Andes no creen en Dios for review by the Academy, but it did not appear on the list of official submissions.
 The submission for India, Eklavya: The Royal Guard, was the target of a lawsuit alleging that India's selection committee was tied to the production staff of Eklavya; however, India retained the film as its submission.
 The Academy determined that Israel's first submission, The Band's Visit, contained too much English dialogue for the film to meet Academy requirements, and Israel submitted Beaufort as a replacement.
 The Academy determined that Taiwan's initial submission, Lust, Caution, had insufficient Taiwanese participation to be considered a valid entry under Academy rules, and Taiwan submitted Island Etude as a replacement.
 The British Academy of Film and Television Arts was subject to criticism for not submitting the Scottish Gaelic Seachd: The Inaccessible Pinnacle or the Welsh Calon Gaeth.

References
General

Specific

External links

Official website for the 80th Academy Awards

80